Harley Duane "Moose" Dow (October 19, 1925 – March 25, 2014) was an American football lineman who played at the guard and tackle positions.

A native of Mt. Hope, Kansas, he attended Verdugo Hills High School in California and played college football for the San Jose State Spartans. He was co-captain of the 1949 San Jose State Spartans football team that won the conference championship and defeated Texas Tech in the Raisin Bowl. At the end of the 1949 season, he was named to the United Press Little All-Coast football team.

Dow then played professional football in the National Football League (NFL) for the San Francisco 49ers during the 1950 season. He appeared in 12 NFL games, six of them as a starter. He was the only rookie named to the 49ers' starting lineup in 1950.

References

1925 births
2014 deaths
San Francisco 49ers players
San Jose State Spartans football players
Players of American football from Kansas
People from Sedgwick County, Kansas